Mickey & Sylvia was an American R&B duo composed of Mickey Baker and Sylvia Vanderpool, who later became Sylvia Robinson. They are best known for their number-one R&B single "Love Is Strange" in 1957.

Baker and Vanderpool began recording together in 1954. They first recorded as Mickey & Sylvia in 1955 on Rainbow Records before signing to Groove Records where they became the first big seller for the label. The duo later formed their own label, Willow Records. Although Mickey & Sylvia initially disbanded in 1958, they reunited in 1960 and continued to record together on an infrequent basis until 1965, when Baker moved to France.

Career 
In the mid-1950s, music instructor Mickey Baker was inspired by the success of husband-and-wife musical duo Les Paul & Mary Ford to form a duo with one of his pupils Sylvia Robinson. They released their first record together, "Fine Love," as "Little" Sylvia Vanderpool with Mickey Baker and His Band on Cat Records in 1954.

Baker and Vanderpool released their first record, "I'm So Glad," as Mickey & Sylvia on Rainbow Records in 1955. They recorded for the RCA label subsidiary Groove Records in 1956. While sharing the bill with Bo Diddley at Howard Theatre in Washington, D.C., Vanderpool was inspired by his song "Love Is Strange." With his blessing, Mickey & Sylvia recorded their own rendition. Their single was released in November 1956. It became their biggest hit, topping the US R&B chart and peaking at No. 11 in the US pop chart in January 1957. The record sold over one million copies and was awarded a gold disc by the RIAA.

In 1957, Mickey & Sylvia recorded for Vik Records. They had two other singles chart in 1957 with "There Oughta Be A Law" and "Dearest." In 1958, Mickey & Sylvia split up because Vanderpool wanted to pursue a solo career. Vanderpool married Joseph Robinson in 1959 and thereafter went by Sylvia Robinson. Baker replaced her with singer Kitty Noble. Mickey & Kitty released three records on Atlantic Records in 1959. Baker also released his debut solo album, The Wildest Guitar, in 1959.

After a two year hiatus, Mickey & Sylvia were reunited by Hugo & Luigi at RCA Victor in 1960. They also established a publishing company. In 1961, they formed their own label, Willow Records, distributed by King Records, which produced the singles "Lovedrops" and "Baby You're So Fine." That year they contributed to Ike & Tina Turner's hit record "It's Gonna Work Out Fine." Robinson produced the track and played guitar while Baker played the role of Ike Turner. The single earned Ike & Tina Turner their first Grammy Award nomination. Ike Turner wrote Mickey & Sylvia's song "He Gave Me Everything," which was released as a B-side single to "Since I Fell For You" in 1962.

A second studio recording of "Love Is Strange" in 1962 featured now-legendary drummer Bernard "Pretty" Purdie, on his first paid session gig.

After the duo split, Baker recorded a successful instrumental solo album, The Wildest Guitar. He moved to France in the 1960s, where he worked with various French musicians. Baker died at his home in Montastruc-la-Conseillère, France on November 27, 2012, at the age of 87.

Sylvia Robinson had a hit record in 1973 with "Pillow Talk," and was subsequently a driving force in the creation of the Sugar Hill rap label. Robinson died in 2011, at the age of 76.

Legacy 
"Love Is Strange" (in its 1956 version) was later featured in movies like Dirty Dancing, Badlands and Casino, and was covered many times (for instance, on Paul McCartney's third post-Beatles album Wild Life). The song became a UK hit by the Everly Brothers in 1965. Peaches & Herb had a hit with their rendition in 1967.

In 2004, "Love Is Strange" was inducted into the Grammy Hall of Fame.

Discography

Albums 
 1957: New Sounds (Vik LX-1102)
 1965: "Love Is Strange" And Other Bests (RCA Camden CAL-863/CAS-863) (LP compilation)
 1973: Mickey And Sylvia Do It Again (RCA Victor APM-1-0327) (LP compilation)
 1989: Love Is Strange & Other Hits (RCA/BMG 9900-2-R) (CD compilation)
 1990: Love Is Strange (Bear Family BCD-15438) (2-CD compilation)
 1995: The Willow Sessions (Sequel NEM-CD-763) (CD compilation)
 1997: Love Is Strange: A Golden Classics Edition (Collectables COL-5833) (CD compilation)

Singles

References

External links
Mickey & Sylvia on AllMusic
Mickey & Sylvia Discography

American rhythm and blues musical groups
Rhythm and blues duos
American musical duos
Male–female musical duos
African-American musical groups
RCA Victor artists
Groove Records artists
King Records artists